Claudia Roden  (née Douek; born 1936) is an Egyptian-born British cookbook writer and cultural anthropologist of Sephardi/Mizrahi descent. She is best known as the author of Middle Eastern cookbooks including A Book of Middle Eastern Food, The New Book of Middle Eastern Food and Arabesque—Sumptuous Food from Morocco, Turkey and Lebanon.

Early life

Roden was born in 1936 in Cairo, Kingdom of Egypt, the daughter of Cesar Elie Douek and his wife Nelly Sassoon. Her parents were from prominent Syrian-Jewish merchant families who migrated from Aleppo in the previous century; she grew up in Zamalek, Cairo, with two brothers, the surgeon Ellis Douek, and Zaki Douek.

She was Egypt's national backstroke swimming champion at the age of 15.

In 1951 Roden moved to Paris and went to boarding school for three years. In 1954 she moved to London where she studied painting at St. Martin's School of Art. She shared a flat with her brothers Ellis Douek and Zaki Douek. In the London flat Roden, while preparing the meals for her brothers, started to experiment with cooking. She remembered family recipes from Alphandary, pies with aubergine and spinach, and mint and lamb. Both were foods not often cooked in London in that period and so finding ingredients in London was an adventure.

She did not return to Egypt for a quarter of a century, well after her family and most of Cairo's Jewish community had been expelled; many of her books reflect her longing for the close communal culture that was lost, especially as expressed in the culinary arts and social occasions associated with them.

Career

Besides her numerous cookery volumes, Roden has also worked as a food writer and a cooking show presenter for the BBC.

Food writers and chefs such as Melissa Clark and Yotam Ottolenghi have credited her with playing a large role in introducing the food of Egypt in particular and the Middle East in general to Britain and the United States. Paul Levy classes her with such other food writers as Elizabeth David, Julia Child, Jane Grigson, and Sri Owen who, from the 1950s on, "deepened the conversation around food to address questions of culture, context, history and identity." Her many cookbooks, Clark writes, have "produced a genre of works that is at once literary and deeply researched while still being, at heart, practical manuals on how to make delicious meals."

Roles
President (previously co-chair) of the Oxford Symposium on Food and Cookery (2012 – present)

Honorary Fellow of University College London (2008)

Visiting Fellow Yale University, USA (2010 – 2011)

Honorary Fellow of the School of Oriental and African Studies (2012)

Personal life

In 1959, she married Paul Roden, a clothes importer, and they separated after 15 years.
They had three children.

She has lived in Hampstead Garden Suburb since the early 1970s.

Activities and awards

 1997 - The National Jewish Book Award in the Sephardic and Ashkenazic Culture and Customs category for The Book of Jewish Food
 Roden is a Patron of London-based HIV charity The Food Chain. 
 1999 - Prince Claus Award "in recognition of her exceptional initiatives and achievements in the field of culture." from the Prince Claus Fund, an international culture and development organisation based in Amsterdam.
 2005 - André Simon Memorial Fund Food Book Prize for non-fiction for The Book of Jewish Food.
 2005 - Glenfiddich Best Food Book award for Arabesque.
 2019 : Observer Food Monthly Awards: Lifetime achievement
 2022 - Roden was appointed Commander of the Order of the British Empire (CBE) in the 2022 New Year Honours for services to food culture.

Publications 

1968: A Book of Middle Eastern Food,  (reprint)
1970: A New Book of Middle Eastern Food,  (reprint)
1978 Coffee, (Faber & Faber 1978) New updated edition Pavillion (1994) 
1981: Picnic: The Complete Guide to Outdoor Food,  (reprint)
1986: Middle Eastern Cooking, 
1987: Mediterranean Cookery, accompanied The BBC TV series (BBC Books 1987, newly enlarged edition Penguin Classic 1998)  (reprint)
1990: The Food of Italy,  (reprint)
1992: Claudia Roden's Invitation to Mediterranean Cooking: 150 Vegetarian and Seafood Recipes,  (reprint)
1995: Everything Tastes Better Outdoors,  (reprint)
1996: The Book of Jewish Food: An Odyssey from Samarkand and Vilna to the Present Day,  (reprint)
1999: Coffee: A Connoisseur's Companion, 
1999: Tamarind and Saffron: Favourite Recipes from the Middle East,  (reprint)
2000: The New Book of Middle Eastern Food, 
2001: Picnics: And Other Outdoor Feasts,  (reprint)
2003: Claudia Roden's Foolproof Mediterranean Cooking, 
2003: Foreword to Traditional Moroccan Cooking by Madame Guinaudeau,  (reprint)
2004: The Arab-Israeli Cookbook: The Recipes, with Robin Soans, 
2005: Arabesque - Sumptuous Food from Morocco, Turkey and Lebanon, 
2006: Arabesque: A Taste of Morocco, Turkey, and Lebanon, 
2007: Simple Mediterranean Cookery, 
2011: The Food of Spain, 
2021: Claudia Roden’s Mediterranean,

References

External links
 Claudia Roden, entry by Joan Nathan in Jewish Women: A Comprehensive Historical Encyclopedia (Jewish Women's Archive), 20 March 2009. Retrieved January 5, 2010 
 Claudia Roden interview by Máirtín Mac Con Iomaire (Oxford Oral History Project)
 Take the Spice Route - article by Roden
 Capsule biography at Penguin Books
 Capsule biography  at the BBC
 Staff page at SOAS, the School of Oriental and African Studies

English food writers
Commanders of the Order of the British Empire
Egyptian Jews
1936 births
Living people
Jewish cuisine
Middle Eastern cuisine
Women cookbook writers
Egyptian emigrants to England
Alumni of Saint Martin's School of Art
Writers from Cairo
James Beard Foundation Award winners
Egyptian female swimmers
Naturalised citizens of the United Kingdom
Egyptian people of Jewish descent
British Jews
British people of Syrian-Jewish descent
British people of Egyptian-Jewish descent